Koogle is a flavored peanut butter brand.

Koogle may also refer to:
Jacob Koogle, Medal of Honor recipient during the American Civil War
Timothy Koogle, first CEO of Yahoo!